Romana Tomc (born 2 November 1965) is a Slovenian politician and Member of the European Parliament (MEP) from Slovenia. She is a member of the Slovenian Democratic Party, part of the European People's Party.

Political career
Tomc has been a Member of the European Parliament since the 2014 elections. In parliament, she has since been serving on the Committee on Employment and Social Affairs. 

In addition to her committee assignments, Tomc is part of the parliament's delegation for Northern cooperation and for relations with Switzerland and Norway and to the EU-Iceland Joint Parliamentary Committee and the European Economic Area (EEA) Joint Parliamentary Committee. She is also a supporter of the MEP Alliance for Mental Health and the MEPs Against Cancer group.

On the national level, Tomc was the candidate of the Slovenian Democratic Party (SDS) in the 22 October 2017 presidential election, challenging incumbent Borut Pahor.

Recognition
In December 2020, Tomc received the Employment, Social Affairs and Regions award at The Parliament Magazine's annual MEP Awards.

References

External links

Official website

1965 births
Living people
Politicians from Ljubljana
MEPs for Slovenia 2014–2019
Slovenian Democratic Party MEPs
Slovenian Democratic Party politicians
Members of the National Assembly (Slovenia)
MEPs for Slovenia 2019–2024